Reyes del Bajo Mundo ("Kings of the Under World", commonly abbreviated RDBM) is a Salvadoran hip hop group. The group was formed in 1992 and is conformed by Cruz Control and Douglas Dinamico. A third member named Rey de Reyes left the group due to immigration problems. They are considered to be the original hip hop pioneers of El Salvador and the first group to bring Salvadoran hip hop to mainstream radio, television, and newspapers, with their release of Estilo Impereal in 1997 under their own independent label. They were followed by PESCOZADA and later by Crooked Stilo. They are also the only Salvadoran group in New York (where they grew up) to have shared the stage with Rebel Diaz, Sadat X, Immortal Technique, R.A. Ruggedman, Joel Ortiz, Control Machete, Orishas, EL MESWY, Los Rabanes, MALA RODRIGUEZ, AKWID, and others during their career. RDBM also originated in Far Rockaway, Queens, and Douglas attended Far Rockaway High School.

Discography
Revolucion Del Bajo Mundo (2009)
Spark la Musica (2005)
Nuevo Musicon (2003)
STILO IMPEREAL (1997)

See also
Salvadoran hip hop

External links
 Official Website
 Official MySpace Webpage

Salvadoran rappers